A Time to Remember is a 2003 American television drama film directed by John Putch and starring Doris Roberts and Dana Delany.

Premise
Maggie Calhoun is diagnosed with Alzheimer's disease. Her two very different daughters, Britt and Valetta, come together on Thanksgiving Day.

Cast
 Doris Roberts as Maggie Calhoun
 Dana Delany as Britt Calhoun
 Megan Gallagher as Valetta Proctor
 Louise Fletcher as Billy
 Rosemary Forsyth as Dorothy Walderson
 Robert Bauer as Nicholas
 Erich Anderson as Julian Proctor
 Amy Steel as Claire Goodman Isenberg
 Davenia McFadden as Marion
 Michael Dean Jacobs as Cousin Merle
 Karly Rothenberg as Cousin Connie

References

External links
 

2003 television films
2003 films
American drama television films
2000s English-language films
2000s American films